Ginuwine... the Bachelor is the debut studio album by American R&B artist Ginuwine. The second major Swing Mob album, it was chiefly produced by Timbaland and released October 8, 1996 on 550 Music. Distribution was handled through Epic Records. The album peaked at number 26 on the US Billboard 200 and reached number 14 on Billboards R&B Albums chart. A steady seller, it was certified gold by January 1997 and double platinum by March 1999. In March 1999, the album was certified double platinum in sales by the Recording Industry Association of America (RIAA), after sales exceeding two million copies in the United States. Ginuwine... the Bachelor featured the singles "Pony", "When Doves Cry" and "Holler".

Track listing
All music by Timbaland.

Samples
 "Intro" contains portions of dialogue from the motion picture The Usual Suspects and a sample of "The Greatest Trick" written by John Ottman for The Usual Suspects soundtrack.
 "Lonely Daze" contains a sample of You Are Everything, written by Thom Bell, Linda Creed, as performed by The Stylistics
 "I'll Do Anything/I'm Sorry" contains a sample from "Visions" as recorded by Stevie Wonder.
 "G. Thang" contains samples from "Numb" by Portishead, "The Boomin' System" by LL Cool J, Brown Sugar by D'Angelo

Personnel
Credits taken from AllMusic.

Art direction – Cozbi Sanchez-Cabrera
Assembling – Alex Perialas, Jerry Conaway Jr
Assistant engineering – Jason Arnold
Coordination – Nadine Hemy
Engineering – Jimmy Douglass, Alex Perialas
Executive production – Ginuwine, Robert Reives
Grooming – Isabel le Page
Mastering – Vlad

Mixing – Jimmy Douglass
Photography – Carl Lessard
Production – Ginuwine, Robert Reives, Timbaland
Rapping – (Ex) Cat Heads, Magoo, Missy Elliott, Nikki/Virginia Slim, Timbaland
Stylist – Estée Ochoa
Vocals – Ginuwine
Vocals (background) – Ginuwine, Missy Elliott, Timbaland

Charts

Weekly charts

Year-end charts

Certifications

References

External links
 
 

1996 debut albums
Albums produced by Timbaland
Albums produced by Missy Elliott
Epic Records albums
550 Music albums
Ginuwine albums